Kateryna Baindl (née Kozlova ; born 20 February 1994) is a Ukrainian tennis player. On 19 February 2018, she achieved a career-high singles ranking of world No. 62. On 22 October 2012, she peaked at No. 139 in the doubles rankings. Up to date, Kozlova has won one singles title on the WTA Challenger Tour as well as five singles and 13 doubles titles on the ITF Circuit.

Career

2015: Top 100 debut, suspension due to doping
On 6 April 2015 she made her top 100 debut in the singles rankings.

On 27 May 2015, the International Tennis Federation announced that Kozlova has been found to have committed an anti-doping rule violation. She was found positive to a doping substance after taking a stimulant, dimethylbutylamine. Kozlova's suspension was reduced to six months starting from 15 February to 15 August 2015.

2018
At the French Open, Kozlova became the second player to defeat a defending champion in the first round of Roland Garros, after a straight sets victory over 2017 champion Jeļena Ostapenko.

2022
At the Poland Open, she reached the semifinals as a qualifier where she lost to Ana Bogdan. As a result she moved 56 positions up in the rankings to world No. 134 on 1 August 2022.

She reached No. 124 on 26 September 2022, the highest ranking for the season. At the Emilia-Romagna Open in Parma, she qualified into the main draw where she was defeated by world No. 7 and top seed Maria Sakkari.

2023: Australian Open third round

Performance timeline

Only main-draw results in WTA Tour, Grand Slam tournaments, Fed Cup/Billie Jean King Cup and Olympic Games are included in win–loss records.

Singles
Current after the 2023 Australian Open.

Doubles

WTA career finals

Singles: 1 (runner-up)

WTA Challenger finals

Singles: 2 (1 title, 1 runner-up)

ITF Circuit finals

Singles: 11 (5 titles, 6 runner–ups)

Doubles: 22 (13 titles, 9 runner–ups)

Wins over top 10 players

Notes

References

External links
 
 

1994 births
Living people
Ukrainian female tennis players
Sportspeople from Mykolaiv
Doping cases in tennis
Ukrainian sportspeople in doping cases